Aylesbury bus station is a bus station in Aylesbury. It is situated under friars square shopping centre 
The bus station has been noted for its unwelcoming environment, being situated under friars square shopping centre . The local council have stated it is looking at a long-term solution for the bus station.

References

Bus stations in England
Aylesbury
Transport in Buckinghamshire
Buildings and structures in Buckinghamshire